Groß Vollstedt is a municipality in the district of Rendsburg-Eckernförde, in Schleswig-Holstein, Germany. The village is located in the triangle between the cities Rendsburg, Kiel and Neumünster and the highways A 7, A 210 and A 215. The lakes Vollstedter See and Brahmsee are located in the vicinity.

At the end of the 19th century a water tower was erected in Groß Vollstedt. The tower is still preserved but it is no longer in use.

References

Municipalities in Schleswig-Holstein
Rendsburg-Eckernförde